is a 2002 anime film. It is the 10th film based on the popular comedy manga and anime series Crayon Shin-chan. The film was released to theatres on April 20, 2002, in Japan. It is the final film in the series to use traditional cel animation, and the last film to be written and directed by frequent director and animator of the saga Keiichi Hara.

The film was produced by Shin-Ei Animation, the studio behind the anime television. Its only screening in the US was on April 26, 2014, in Japanese with English subtitles as Crayon Shin Chan: Bravo! Samurai Battle! at the Embassy of Japan. It was released as Crayon Shinchan The Movie: Battle in the Daimyo Era with English subtitles on VCD and DVD by PMP Entertainment.

A Japanese live-action movie based on this movie called Ballad (BALLAD 名もなき恋のうた) was released in 2009.

Cast
Akiko Yajima - Shinnosuke Nohara
Keiji Fujiwara - Hiroshi Nohara
Miki Narahashi - Misae Nohara
Satomi Kōrogi - Himawari
Yusaku Yara - Yoshitoshi Matabe Ijiri
Ai Kobayashi - Ren Kasuga
Michio Hazama - Yasutsuna
Chikao Ōtsuka - Yorihisa
Kazuhiro Yamaji - Takatora Ōkurai
Kenichi Ogata - Niemon
Noriko Uemura - Osato
Keiko Yamamoto - Yoshino
Hiroyuki Miyasako (Ameagari Kesshitai) - Hikozo
Tōru Hotohara (Ameagari Kesshitai) - Gisuke
Rokurō Naya - Tadatsugu
Tesshō Genda - Hayato
Hidenari Ugaki - Gonbe Sakuma
Fumihiko Tachiki - Naotaka Magara Tarozaemon

Reception 
Out of all the long-running anime film franchises (Detective Conan, Doraemon, One Piece, Dragon Ball, Pokémon, etc.), it is the only anime film to ever win Grand Prize in the Japan Media Arts Festival Animation Division, even within the Crayon Shin Chan series.

Writer Kazuki Nakashima of Gurren Lagann fame also praised this film, even calling it a 'masterpiece'.

Accolades

See also
 Crayon Shin-chan
 Yoshito Usui
 Sengoku Period

References

External links
 
 

2002 anime films
Fierceness That Invites Storm! The Battle of the Warring States
Toho animated films
Films directed by Keiichi Hara